The Vice President of Brazil, officially the Vice President of the Federative Republic of Brazil (Vice-Presidente da República Federativa do Brasil), or simply the Vice President of the Republic (Vice-Presidente da República) is the second-highest ranking government official in the executive branch of the Government of Brazil, preceded only by the President. The vice president's primary role is to replace the president on the event of their death, resignation, or impeachment, and to temporarily take over the presidential powers and duties while the president is abroad, or otherwise temporarily unable to carry out their duties. The vice president is elected jointly with the president as their running mate.

The office has existed since the Proclamation of the Republic in 1889, although it was only officially instituted as of the 1891 Constitution. It has been in place throughout all of Brazil's republican history, save for the fifteen years of the Vargas Era and almost three years during the parliamentary regime, when it was officially abolished.

Requirements
The requirements to run for the office of vice president are exactly those of the presidency itself. In addition to the ordinary requirements to run for political office in Brazil, under the terms of article 14 of the Constitution, a candidate for the vice presidency must be a natural-born citizen of Brazil (which under certain circumstances may include the offspring of one or two Brazilian parents living abroad) and be at least 35 years of age.

Election and tenure
The president and the vice president are elected on a single ticket for a four-year term and are inaugurated on 1 January of the year following that of the election. Both may be re-elected for a subsequent term.

Vice presidents succeeding a sitting president may be reelected for an additional term. However, the vice president is not eligible to run for a second full term, as under Brazilian law any partial term counts toward the limit of two consecutive terms. Due to the wording of the constitution's provisions on term limits, whenever the vice president serves as acting president when the president is either abroad or suspended from office as a result of impeachment, it counts as a partial term.

Workplace and official residence
The vice president works in an annex building of the Palácio do Planalto. The official residence of the vice president is the Palácio do Jaburu, inaugurated in 1977.

Ascension to the presidency
Since the Proclamation of the Republic in 1889, eight vice presidents have been called upon to replace former presidents: four due to death of the incumbent (Nilo Peçanha, Delfim Moreira, Café Filho, and José Sarney), two due to resignation (Floriano Peixoto and João Goulart), and two due to impeachment conviction (Itamar Franco and Michel Temer).

List of vice presidents
 Vice presidents elect directly
 Vice presidents elect indirectly

See also
List of current vice presidents

Notes

References

External links
Vice-Presidency of Brazil Official Website
Official vice presidential portrait

 
Brazil
Executive branch of Brazil